Sweden competed at the 1980 Summer Olympics in Moscow, Soviet Union. 145 competitors, 122 men and 23 women, took part in 102 events in 18 sports.

Medalists

Gold
Johan Harmenberg — Fencing, Men's Épée Individual 
Bengt Baron — Swimming, Men's 100 metres Backstroke
Pär Arvidsson — Swimming, Men's 100 metres Butterfly

Silver
Per Holmertz — Swimming, Men's 100 metres Freestyle
Lars-Göran Carlsson — Shooting, men's Skeet Shooting 
Agneta Eriksson, Tina Gustafsson, Carina Ljungdahl and Agneta Mårtensson — Swimming, Women's 4x100 metres Freestyle Relay

Bronze
Per Johansson — Swimming, Men's 100 metres Freestyle
Sven Johansson — Shooting, Men's Small-bore Rifle, Three Positions
Benni Ljungbeck — Wrestling, Men's Greco-Roman Bantamweight
Lars-Erik Skiöld — Wrestling, Men's Greco-Roman Lightweight
Göran Marström and Jörgen Ragnarsson — Sailing, Men's Tornado Team Competition
George Horvath, Svante Rasmuson and Lennart Pettersson — Modern Pentathlon, Men's Team Competition

Archery

Two of the three Swedish archers in 1980 had competed at both the 1972 and 1976 Olympics. Anna-Lisa Berglund and Rolf Svensson were both less successful than they had been in Montreal four years before. 

Women's Individual Competition:
Anna-Lisa Berglund — 2283 points (→ 16th place)

Men's Individual Competition:
Göran Bjerendal — 2408 points (→ 12th place)
Rolf Svensson — 2357 points (→ 20th place)

Athletics

Men's Marathon
 Kjell-Erik Ståhl
 Final — 2:17:44 (→ 19th place)

 Tommy Persson
 Final — 2:21:11 (→ 30th place)

 Göran Hagberg
 Final — did not finish (→ no ranking)

Men's 400 m Hurdles
 Christer Gullstrand
 Heat — 50.95
 Semifinals — did not start (→ did not advance)

Men's 3,000 m Steeplechase
 Anders Carlson
 Heat — 9:01.8 (→ did not advance)

Men's Pole Vault
 Miro Zalar
 Qualification — 5.40 m
 Final — 5.35 m (→ 10th place)

Men's Discus Throw
 Kenth Gardenkrans
 Qualification — 62.58 m
 Final — 60.24 m (→ 12th place)

Men's 20 km Walk
 Alf Brandt
 Final — 1:34:44.0 (→ 13th place)

Bo Gustafsson
 Final — DSQ (→ no ranking)

Men's 50 km Walk
Bengt Simonsen
 Final — 3:57:08 (→ 4th place)

Bo Gustafsson
 Final — did not finish (→ no ranking)

Women's 100 metres
 Linda Haglund
 Heat — 11.37
 Quarterfinals — 11.31
 Semifinals — 11.36
 Final — 11.16 (→ 4th place)

Women's 100 m Hurdles
Helena Pihl 
 Heat — 13.46
 Semifinal — 13.68 (→ did not advance)

Women's High Jump
 Susanne Lorentzon
 Qualification — 1.85 m (→ did not advance)

 Ann-Ewa Karlsson
 Qualification — 1.80 m (→ did not advance)

Basketball

Summary

Men's Team Competition
Preliminary Round (Group C)
 Lost to Italy (77-92)
 Lost to Cuba (59-71)
 Lost to Australia (55-64)
Semi Final Round (Group B)
 Defeated Senegal (70-64)
 Lost to Czechoslovakia (61-83)
 Defeated India (119-63)
 Defeated Poland (70-67) → 10th place

Team Roster:
 Peter Andersson
 Thomas Nordgren
 Peter Gunterberg
 Göran Unger
 Torbjörn Taxén
 Joon-Olof Karlsson
 Jan Enjebo
 Bernt Malion
 Roland Rahm
 Sten Feldreich
 Leif Yttergren
 Åke Skyttevall

Boxing

Men's Featherweight (57 kg)
Odd Bengtsson
 First Round — Bye
 Second Round — Lost to Adolfo Horta (Cuba) on points (0-5)

Men's Lightweight (60 kg)
Kalervo Alanenpää
 First Round — Lost to Omari Golaya (Tanzania) on points (0-5)

Men's Light-Welterweight (63,5 kg)
Shadrach Odhiambo
 First Round — Defeated Bogdan Gajda (Poland) on points (4-1)
 Second Round — Lost to Anthony Willis (Great Britain) on points (0-5)

Men's Heavyweight (+ 81 kg)
Anders Eklund
 First Round — Bye
 Quarter Finals — Lost to István Lévai (Hungary) on points (1-4)

Canoeing

Cycling

Six cyclists represented Sweden in 1980.

Individual road race
 Peter Jonsson
 Bernt Scheler
 Anders Adamson
 Mats Gustafsson

Team time trial
 Anders Adamson
 Bengt Asplund
 Mats Gustafsson
 Håkan Karlsson

Diving

Fencing

Six fencers, five men and one woman, represented Sweden in 1980.

Men's épée
 Johan Harmenberg
 Rolf Edling
 Hans Jacobson

Men's team épée
 Johan Harmenberg, Rolf Edling, Leif Högström, Göran Malkar, Hans Jacobson

Women's foil
 Kerstin Palm

Gymnastics

Judo

Wolfgang Biedron

Modern pentathlon

Three male pentathletes represented Sweden in 1980. They won the bronze in the team event.

Men's Individual Competition:
Svante Rasmuson — 5,373 pts → (4th place)
Lennart Pettersson — 5,243 pts → (7th place)
George Horvath — 5,229 pts → (9th place)

Men's Team Competition:
Rasmuson, Pettersson, and Horvath — 15,845 pts → ( Bronze Medal)

Rowing

Sailing

Shooting

Swimming

Men's 100 m Freestyle
Per Holmertz
 Heats — 52.01
 Semi-Finals — 51.19
 Final — 50.91 (→  Silver Medal)
Per Johansson
 Heats — 52.11
 Semi-Finals — 51.42
 Final — 51.29 (→  Bronze Medal)
Per Wikström
 Heats — 52.29
 Semi-Finals — 52.15 (→ did not advance)

Men's 200 m Freestyle
Thomas Lejdström
 Heats — 1:53.04
 Final — 1:52.94 (→ 7th place)
Per-Ola Quist
 Heats — 1:55.38 (→ did not advance) 
Per Wikström
 Heats — 1:53.59 (→ did not advance)

Men's 100 m Butterfly
Pär Arvidsson
 Final — 54.92 (→  Gold Medal)

Men's 200 m Butterfly
Pär Arvidsson
 Final — 2:02.61 (→ 7th place)

Men's 100 m Backstroke
Bengt Baron
 Final — 56.53 (→  Gold Medal)

Men's 200 m Backstroke
Michael Söderlund
 Final — 2:04.10 (→ 6th place)

Men's 200 m Breaststroke
Peter Berggren
 Final — 2:21.65 (→ 7th place)

Men's 4 × 200 m Freestyle Relay
Michael Söderlund, Per Wikström, Per-Alvar Magnusson, and Thomas Lejdström
 Final — 7:30.10 (→ 4th place)

Women's 100 m Freestyle
Agneta Eriksson
 Final — 57.90 (→ 8th place)

Women's 100 m Butterfly
Agneta Mårtensson
 Final — 1:02.61 (→ 6th place)

Women's 200 m Butterfly
Agneta Mårtensson
 Final — 2:15.22 (→ 7th place)

Women's 100 m Breaststroke
Eva-Marie Håkansson
 Heats — 1:12.26
 Final — 1:11.72 (→ 5th place)

Women's 400 m Individual Medley
Ann-Sofi Roos
 Heats — 4:57.13 (→ did not advance)

Women's 4 × 100 m Freestyle Relay
Carina Ljungdahl, Tina Gustafsson, Agneta Mårtensson, and Agneta Eriksson
 Final — 7:30.10 (→  Silver Medal)

Women's 4 × 100 m Medley Relay
Annika Uvehall, Eva-Marie Håkansson, Agneta Mårtensson, and Tina Gustafsson 
 Final — 4:16.91 (→ 4th place)

Water polo

Summary

Men's Team Competition
Preliminary Round (Group B)
 Lost to Spain (3-7)
 Drew with Italy (4-4)
 Lost to Soviet Union (1-12)
Final Round (Group B)
 Lost to Greece (5-9)
 Lost to Italy (3-8)
 Lost to Romania (3-8)
 Lost to Australia (4-9)
 Defeated Bulgaria (8-6) → 11th place

Team Roster
 Anders Flodqvist
 Kenth Karlson
 Hans Lundén
 Tommy Danielson
 Sören Carlsson
 Christer Stenberg
 Gunnar Johansson
 Peter Carlström
 Lars Skåål
 Per Arne Andersson
 Arne Claesson

Weightlifting

Wrestling

References

Nations at the 1980 Summer Olympics
1980 Summer Olympics
Summer Olympics